The 2001 Bayern Rundfahrt was the 22nd edition of the Bayern Rundfahrt cycle race and was held on 23 May to 27 May 2001. The race started in Pfarrkirchen and finished in Forchheim. The race was won by Jens Voigt.

General classification

References

Bayern-Rundfahrt
2001 in German sport